Perth Modern School (colloquially known as Perth Mod, or simply "Mod") is a public co-educational academically selective high school, located in Subiaco, an inner city suburb of Perth, Western Australia. Perth Modern is Western Australia's only fully academically selective public school. Established in 1911, the school is both the oldest public high school and the oldest co-educational high school in Western Australia (WA).

History

Planning and construction 
Perth Modern School was the first government high school in WA. Although funds were allocated to build the school in 1907, the west building and main hall contract was not tendered until 1909 due to debate continuing for some time.

Opening and academic scholarships 
The school opened in 1911 with 226 students enrolled. The school charged a fee of £6 a year. Students were prepared for entry to the University of Western Australia, which opened in 1913. Demand for places at the school was high and students came from all over WA. In 1912, the school began offering scholarships designed to encourage students to attend regardless of their financial situations.

Cecil Andrews, Inspector General of Schools, was responsible for naming the school and directing its school curriculum.

Educational concepts 
When it opened, Perth Modern School introduced three concepts into WA education:

 Co-education 
 No corporal punishment, detention, or arbitrary/authoritative punishment
 The teaching of modern languages (such as French), and rejection of Classical studies as the core of the curriculum

Prior to Perth Modern School, the only high schools in WA were eight independent schools. These schools were sectarian, unisex, high fee paying schools, and only three catered for girls.

Local-intake school and music scholarships 
In 1958 Perth Modern School became a local-intake school, with no academic entrance requirements and accepting primarily students who lived nearby. In 1968 music became a focus of the school, with the first music scholarships awarded; the last intake of students on a music scholarship occurred in 2006. By 1970, the school orchestra was formed and the Joseph Parsons Memorial Library opened. A home for English as a second language was opened in the former Thomas Street Primary School located on the school grounds, and was run by Perth Modern School.

Return to academic selection 
In 2005, a return to academic selection was announced so as to better serve the needs of WA's gifted students. Perth Modern School began to take in students on the basis of academic selection in 2007 for years 8, 10 and 11. By 2011 (the centenary of the school's opening) all students had been selected through the Gifted and Talented Program. The gifted program in WA is based on Francois Gagne's Differentiated Model of Giftedness and Talent.

Governance 
In 2012, Perth Modern became an Independent Public School.

School structure 
Despite the worldwide acceptance of corporal punishment in education at the time of the school's opening, as a tool to enforce authority, students were instead encouraged to develop self-discipline and motivation through the message that education was the key to future success. This is reflected through the motto "Savoir C'est Pouvoir" (Knowledge is Power) and the school emblem of the Sphinx (a reference to the character in Oedipus) which represented knowledge and wisdom.

Although Perth Modern has always been a co-educational school, when it initially opened in 1911, boys and girls were still kept apart in different classrooms and entrances. However, as a co-educational school, it was able to provide the same quality of education to girls as was provided to the boys of the school.

House system
Perth Modern School was excluded by WA private schools from joining established interschool sporting competitions. In 1915, Red, Blue, Gold and Sphinx factions were created to promote sporting rivalry. In 2007, a new house system was introduced to promote competition, recognition of achievement, and participation in extracurricular activities. The houses were named after the school's first four principals: Fredrick Brown, Joseph Parsons, Noel Sampson and Talbot Downing. Awards are given to students who achieve a certain number of required house points. Annually, the house which has achieved the most points is recognised as the Champion House.

Admissions 
All students attend Perth Modern School based on their performance in the Academic Selective Entrance Test, which has been criticised for unfairly advantaging those from privileged backgrounds. Of 2,563 students who sat the test in order to begin schooling in 2020, 225 were accepted.

In 2019, the school was criticised for its lack of socio-educationally disadvantaged students, with 98% of students coming from above-average socio-educational backgrounds, and for having no Indigenous Australian students. Nationally, the school is the second most advantaged, behind only Sydney Grammar School. This prompted calls for changes to the WA system for assessing and supporting gifted students, as the school should reflect the diversity of gifted people. Myriad barriers to inclusivity at the school were noted, including its location in an affluent area and that many advantaged students access tutoring for the entrance test from early primary school.

Curriculum 
When the school first opened, students studied comprehensive science and modern languages as part of their courses, in addition to classical subjects. Until 1928, students attended Perth Modern for four years. The focus of the first two years was on basic subjects, whereas the final two years focused on a more diverse range of subjects. Students could choose from five streams: arts, science, education, commerce and agriculture.

Today, the school primarily teaches based on the Australian Curriculum.

Performing arts

Dance

Perth Modern School hosts the independent Graduate College of Dance, from which a number of acclaimed high-profile dancers have graduated. The Graduate College of Dance is a leading vocational dance school in Australia. The College prepares talented dancers aged 9 to 17 (year 5 to 12) for the dance profession. The college's comprehensive curriculum combines professional dance training with an academic education to tertiary level. The college is a private organisation requiring fees from applicants, enrolled students at Perth Modern School and private students from elsewhere. The Department of Education and Training previously accommodated the Graduate College of Dance at Swanbourne Senior High School. With the amalgamation of Swanbourne into Shenton College in 2000, the department offered the Graduate College of Dance accommodation at the Perth Modern School site due to the availability of appropriate space and suitable dance flooring.

Music

Perth Modern's music programme is available to all enrolled students. Previously, to be accepted into the music program, students were selected after completing an audition.

The programme encompasses the Kodály methodology in its teachings. Most aural and theory concepts are taught with the aid of the philosophies of music by Zoltán Kodály, in which hand signs are used as a way of representing musical notes by holding the hand in a certain position for each note. The music programme places an emphasis on singing. It is a requirement that all students in the programme are in at least one vocal ensemble.

The school has five wind orchestras, three standard orchestras (two string and one symphony) and two classical guitar ensembles as well as various other instrumental groups, chamber choirs and jazz ensembles. The Perth Modern School Symphony Orchestra has the longest tradition of any school ensemble in WA, having been first formed in 1915

Drama

Perth Modern presents a biennial musical production featuring live music performed by students. The first production was in 2014, and was a production of 'The Wizard of Oz'. This was followed by 'High School Musical' in 2016, 'Little Shop of Horrors' in 2018, 'Grease' in 2020 and 'Legally Blonde' in 2022. Perth Modern also put on a variety of other productions throughout each school year, for the year 10, 11 & 12 drama classes.

Campus

List of buildings 
In 2013 the school’s buildings were renamed after several people who had made significant contributions to the school. The school campus consists of the following buildings and centres, notable either in their own right or due to their namesake:

Beasley building

Construction 
Until 2013, the Beasley building was known as the West building. At the time of its construction from 1909 to 1911, the building was Perth Modern's first and only building. The new school was built on land which was formerly part of the northern common in Subiaco, which had been set aside for education purposes. This land was 4 hectares (10 acres) in area and was located between Subiaco and Mueller Roads (later renamed Roberts Road), west of Thomas Street in Subiaco. On 30 July 1909, S B Alexander was awarded the building contract for £11,637. The contract for the west building and main hall specified eight classrooms, art room, library, chemistry and physics laboratories, lecture rooms, as well as cookery and laundry classrooms. These facilities were grouped around the 27.4m by 14.3m (90 ft by 47 ft) central hall. The building was designed by Hillson Beasley, Principal Architect of WA. By 1911, the building was completed for the sum of £18,974.

Design 
Beasley’s design of the west building and main hall comprised three parallel two storey wings facing north and south with a courtyard to the west. The west building is linked by a covered walkway to the third heritage listed wing. The building was typical of Beasley's mixture of formality and informality, with interesting interiors serving ritualised assemblies and examinations. The building reflected many key characteristics of Federation Arts and Crafts architecture. It was constructed from red brick with a stone base facade. Decorative exterior features included white painted cement rending to all framing, quoins, and copings. The design and construction also featured a central landmark clock tower with a battlemented parapet, a tapering roof lantern, and dormer windows. The roofs were designed and built with steeply pitched parapeted gables covered with tiles, and with prominent eaves and exposed ends to rafters. The main hall was set two storeys high with a jarrah ceiling. Carved, sloped, roof rafters were designed to give the interior of the building an ecclesiastical feel. The gallery was built spanning east and west on the first floor with staircases at each end. Other notable details of fine design and craftsmanship of west building included the stained glass transom windows and fanlights executed in Art Nouveau style at the north side of the building and inside the entrance foyer.

Refurbishment and heritage listing 
The west building was refurbished during the late 1980s and the work was recognised and received several awards. The west building and main hall had interim registration by the Heritage Council of WA in 1992, and it entered the State Registry of Historical Places in 2001. The building was included on the basis of aesthetics and by the number of notable alumni who hailed from these doors.

Andrews building
Prior to 2013, the Andrews Building was known as the East building. The East building and older gymnasium were built around 1958, when Perth Modern became a local-intake school. Both buildings have been listed as well sited bearing a functionalist aesthetic. The design and construction have been recognised as fine examples of post-war International style. The new administration building (opened 2009) joins and provides lift access to the east building.

War memorial
The Old Modernians War Memorial was unveiled on 22 October 1922 to commemorate the service of ex-students in World War I. During the war, 186 Modernians enlisted, 29 of whom lost their lives as a result of their service. The names of 24 Modernians are recorded on the monument.  Five names are recorded on a plinth added to the monument in 2020. The memorial was designed by William Hardwick, the Principal Architect of WA in 1920, and it is located between the Beasley building and the oval. Details of the students' military service are recorded on the school's website.

City Beach Residential College

Students from regional areas can board at City Beach Residential College. The college is located in City Beach, next to the International School of Western Australia. It is the only boarding facility for students of public schools in metropolitan Perth.  It can accommodate up to 66 boarders from rural WA. However, it is not exclusively for Perth Modern students; students who are enrolled in selective gifted and talented programs in metropolitan Perth public schools (mainly John Curtin College of the Arts and Perth Modern School) can board there.  the College accommodates 56 students.

Raise the Roof campaign 
In 2016, the 'Raise the Roof' fundraising campaign was launched to raise funds to build a 700-seat auditorium. The campaign was criticised by members of the school’s community. In 2016, students were suspended for criticising the principal via cartoons and social media. Their criticisms arose from funds advertised as being raised for the Princess Margaret Hospital Foundation being partially used for the Raise the Roof project. In 2017 an independent review of the project, initiated by the Department of Education, was published. The review was prompted by a letter sent to the Department’s Director-General by 10 of the 15 board members, describing a loss of confidence in the principal, Lois Joll, due to a lack of consultation on issues including Raise the Roof. The review found fault on both sides, and requested that the Department of Education clarify the role of school boards and appropriate fund allocation. The Director-General chose to keep Joll as principal, describing her as "highly competent". Over the following four months, five members of the school board resigned, including Erica Smyth and the former P&C president. In 2019, the fundraising target to build 500 seats was reached. The Education Department subsequently organised a tender for the first stage of construction. Construction ceremonially began in May 2020, with the building officially opening on September 11 2021.

Heads of school 
The following individuals have served as either Headmaster or Principal of Perth Modern School:

[^] denotes an interim headmaster/principal:

Academic achievements
Perth Modern students consistently perform well in the Western Australian Certificate of Education school rankings. Since 2016, the year 12 cohorts have produced the highest median ranking when compared to the rest of the schools in WA (refer table below).

Since 2011, year 12 students' results in WA are reported as an Australian Tertiary Admission Rank. Perth Modern students achieved the highest all-time median ATAR score for Western Australia in 2018. The record was raised again by Perth Modern students in 2020.

Western Australia ATAR student performance

Beazley Medal winners

Since 1984, a Beazley Medal has been presented to the top ranked academic student in WA each year. , seven Perth Modern Students have won the award:

 2022: Jessica Doan
 2021: Lawrence Nheu
 2018: Pooja Ramesh
 2016: Caitlin Revell
 2015: Hui Min Tay
 2014: Jamin Wu
 2010: Michael Taran

Notable alumni

Perth Modern School alumni are known as Perth Modernians. In 2010, The Age reported that Perth Modern ranked equal fourth among Australian schools based on the number of alumni who had received a top Order of Australia and was the top ranked WA school.
Fourteen Perth Modernians have won Rhodes Scholarships from the University of Western Australia.

Notable Perth Modernians include:

 Garrick Agnew - Olympic swimmer, businessman
 Margaret Battye – lawyer, female rights activist
 Len Buckeridge - founder of Buckeridge Group of Companies
 Elizabeth Gaines - business, first female CEO of Fortescue Metals Group
 Rolf Harris – entertainer, TV personality, artist, musician, actor, sex offender
 Paul Hasluck – 17th Governor-General of Australia, Cabinet minister
 Bob Hawke – 23rd Prime Minister of Australia, ACTU President
 John Hay - leader in academia
 Ralph Honner - Lieutenant Colonel, Australian Ambassador to Ireland 
 Betty Judge-Beazley - athletics world records holder
 John La Nauze - historian
 Katherine Langford - actress
 Malcolm McCusker – 31st Governor of Western Australia
 Emma Matthews - lyric soprano, Opera Australia
 Maxwell Newton – first editor The Australian
 Alan Seymour - playwright, author of The One Day of the Year
 Ralph Slatyer - first Chief Scientist of Australia
 John Stone – Secretary to the Treasury, Australian Senator
 Daryl Williams – Attorney General of Australia
 Albert Wolff – Chief Justice of Western Australia

See also 

 List of schools in the Perth metropolitan area

References

Further reading

External links

Boarding schools in Western Australia
Public high schools in Perth, Western Australia
Rock Eisteddfod Challenge participants
Educational institutions established in 1911
Subiaco, Western Australia
State Register of Heritage Places in the City of Subiaco
1911 establishments in Australia
Selective schools in Western Australia